John Buckingham may refer to:

John Bokyngham (died 1398), treasury official and Bishop of Lincoln
John Buckingham (chemist) (1943–2015), British chemist and author of chemical dictionaries
Jack Buckingham (John Buckingham, 1903–1987), English cricketer and footballer
John Buckingham (MP), in 1416 MP for Northampton (UK Parliament constituency)
John Buckingham (jockey) (1940–2016), rider of Foinavon, winner of the 1967 Grand National